Václav Křížek (born 8 October 1902 - date of death unknown) was a Czech football manager.

Football

In 1949 Křížek became the manager of Lechia Gdańsk, and was the first non-Polish manager in the club's history. When he joined Lechia they were in their first season in the Ekstraklasa. Křížek was unable to keep the team in the division, and was in charge of the team's 8–0 defeat to Polonia Bytom, the result is still the worst defeat in Lechia's history.

Death

Little is known about Křížek's death other than that he died after 1969, and most likely died in France.

References

1902 births
Czech football managers
Lechia Gdańsk managers
Sportspeople from Prague
Year of death missing